This is the order of battle for the Battle of Viluma, also known as the Battle of Sipe-Sipe, during the Spanish American wars of independence.

See also 
Battle of Viluma

References

Spanish American wars of independence orders of battle